General Hogg may refer to:

David R. Hogg (born 1958), U.S. Army lieutenant general
Dorothy A. Hogg (fl. 1990s–2020s), U.S. Air Force lieutenant general
Joseph L. Hogg (1806–1862), Confederate States Army brigadier general
Rudolph Trower Hogg (1877–1955), British Indian Army brigadier general

See also
William M. Hoge (1894–1979), U.S. Army general
Attorney General Hogg (disambiguation)